The smock mill is a type of windmill that consists of a sloping, horizontally weatherboarded, thatched, or shingled tower, usually with six or eight sides. It is topped with a roof or cap that rotates to bring the sails into the wind. This type of windmill got its name from its resemblance to smocks worn by farmers in an earlier period.

Construction
Smock mills differ from tower mills, which are usually cylindrical rather than hexagonal or octagonal, and built from brick or stone masonry instead of timber. The majority of smock mills are octagonal in plan, with a lesser number hexagonal in plan, such as Killick's Mill, Meopham. A very small number of smock mills were decagonal or dodecagonal in plan, an example of the latter being at Wicken, Cambridgeshire.

Distribution
Smock mills exist in Europe and particularly in England, where they were common, particularly in the county of Kent, where the tallest surviving smock mill in the United Kingdom, Union Mill, can be found at Cranbrook. They reached their heyday in the earlier part of the 19th century, after which the advent of steam power started the decline of the windmill. The East End of Long Island has the greatest concentration of smock mills in the U.S., with Beebe Windmill, Hayground Windmill, Pantigo Windmill, Gardiner, Hook Windmill, Gardiner's Island, Watermill, National Links, Southampton/Shinnecock (Cottage), Shelter Island, Wainscott Windmill, three replicas, Little East Neck H.D., Corwith and Reform Inn, and four cottages, Gin Lane, A.W.B.Wood House & Windmill(Montauk), Edwin DeRose and Quail Hill Farms (Deep Ln).

Britain
Designed by the civil engineer John Smeaton, Chimney Mill in Spital Tongues, Newcastle upon Tyne was the first five-sailed smock mill in Britain. It was built in 1782 and is the only surviving smock mill in the North East region. However, the sails and original cap are no longer in place.

The oldest surviving smock mill in England (dated to 1650) is located in Lacey Green, Buckinghamshire. The hexagonal mill has been restored by the Chiltern Society.

Ireland
St Patrick's Tower in Dublin is believed to have once been the largest smock windmill in Europe.

Massachusetts

There is an operating smock mill on Nantucket Island, Massachusetts. Built in 1746 by Nathan Wilbur, a Nantucket sailor who had spent time in Holland, the "Old Mill" is the oldest functioning mill in the United States. It is the only surviving mill of the four smock mills that once stood on Popsquachet ("windy hill" in the Wampanoag language) overlooking Nantucket town. Until late in the 19th century, there was a fifth Nantucket mill called "Round-Top Mill" on the site of the present New North Cemetery. 

The Old Mill was in a very poor derelict condition when it was sold for twenty dollars in 1828 to Jared Gardner for use as "firewood." Instead of dismantling it, Gardner, a carpenter by trade, restored the mill to working condition making it capable once again of grinding corn. The mill was sold again in 1866 to John Francis Sylvia, a Portuguese miller of Azorean descent, who operated it for many years with his assistant Peter Hoy until it fell into disuse in 1892. In 1897, Miss Caroline French purchased the mill at an auction for $850 and donated it to the Nantucket Historical Association (NHA). The NHA restored it in 1937 and continues to maintain it, grind corn and guide tours of the mill during the summer and early autumn. 

Another operating smock mill is found in Orleans, Massachusetts, on Cape Cod. It was originally erected about 1793 on Kendrick's Hill, on land that later became Orleans.  At that time it was known as Elisha Cook's Mill. In 1939, it was moved to Young's hill, in Orleans. It was then known as the Jonathan Young windmill after one of the five owners.  
In 1897 Captain Hunt, a wealthy sea captain, bought the mill and had it moved to his estate in Hyannisport. The mill was moved by oxen and then via a barge to its Hyannisport location. Eventually the Gove family bought the Hunt estate, and in 1983 gave the mill to the Orleans Historical Society, who donated it to the town of Orleans. 
The windmill was disassembled, restored and reassembled at its present site.  It is open for visitors during the summer.

External links 

Good Ground Windmill

List of windmills in New York

References

 
Windmills
eo:Platforma muelejo